Cookin' is an album by American jazz saxophonist Booker Ervin featuring performances recorded in 1960 for the Savoy label.

Reception
The AllMusic review awarded the album 4½ stars.

Track listing
All compositions by Booker Ervin except as indicated
 "Dee Da Do" – 7:32 
 "Mr. Wiggles" – 5:19 
 "You Don't Know What Love Is" (Gene de Paul, Don Raye) – 7:25 
 "Down In the Dumps" – 6:14 
 "Well, Well" – 9:53 
 "Autumn Leaves" (Joseph Kosma, Johnny Mercer, Jacques Prévert) – 7:01
Recorded in Newark, New Jersey on November 26, 1960.

Personnel
Booker Ervin – tenor saxophone 
Richard Williams – trumpet
Horace Parlan – piano
George Tucker – bass
Dannie Richmond – drums

References 

Savoy Records albums
Booker Ervin albums
1960 albums